Heartstrings was the seventh and final solo album released by Canadian singer-songwriter Willie P. Bennett and was released on CD by Bennett's own Bnatural Records in 1998 (Bnatural 0998).

The album was something of a departure for Bennett from his earlier solo work.  Reflecting his many years spent playing mandolin in Fred Eaglesmith's band, the songs were mostly written and performed by Bennett on mandolin and harmonica, instead of guitar.  The musical territory covered on this album is broader than earlier works. In addition to folk, country, bluegrass and blues, Bennett also incorporates elements of klezmer, gospel and classical.

Willie's first ever music video was filmed for the song "Blue Valentine" featuring Keith Glass and Russell deCarle (of Prairie Oyster). The video was produced by Sean Danby and shot in Golden, British Columbia.

The album won a 1999 Juno Award for "best solo roots and traditional album".

Track listing
1.  Sunset Pendulum   (Music & lyrics by WPB)
WPB - mandolin & vocals
Tony Trischka - banjo
Tony Quarrington - guitar

2.  High Park Feeders   (Music & lyrics by WPB)
WPB - mandolin, harmonica & vocal
David Wilcox - acoustic guitar
Jeff Bird - double bass

3.  One Vessel   (Music & lyrics by WPB)
WPB - guitar, harmonica & vocal
Daisy DeBolt - harmony vocal
Ken Whitely - mandolin
Jeff Bird - jaw harp
Ed Hutchison - udu

4.  Waltz Time Medley: Will cheats 'em (WPB); Waltz Time (WPB); Devil's Dream 3/4 (Trad. arr. WPB); Devil's Dream 4/4 (Trad. arr. WPB); Big John McNeil (Trad. arr. WPB)
WPB - mandolin, harmonica & vocal
Amos Garrett - acoustic archtop guitar

5.  (Who's Gonna Get The) Last Word (In)   (Music & lyrics by WPB)
WPB - mandolin & vocal
Bruce Cockburn - acoustic guitar & harmony vocals
Paul Bailie - percussion

6.  Happy On The Moon   (Music & lyrics by WPB)
WPB - guitar, harmonica & vocal
Amos Garrett - acoustic archtop guitar

7.  Restless Wind   (Music & lyrics by WPB)
WPB - mandolin & vocal
Vladimir Gorodkine - cymbalon
Tony Quarington - guitar & mandolin
Michelle Josef - percussion
Tannis Slimmon - harmony Vocal
Jeff Bird - sleigh bells

8.  Blue Valentine   (Music & lyrics by WPB)
WPB - guitar, harmonica & Vocal
Prairie Oyster, aka:
Russell DeCarle - bass & harmony vocals
Keith Glass - lead acoustic guitar & harmony vocal
Joan Bessen - wurlitzer piano & harmony vocal
John P. Allen - fiddle
Michelle Josef - tambourine

9.  Azure   (Music & lyrics by WPB)
WPB - mandolin
Rodeo String Quartet, aka:
Sandy Baron - first violin
Liz Johnston - second violin
Nancy Kersaw - viola
Zoltan Rozsnyai - cello
Paul Bailie - percussion

10.  Billy And Jenny   (Music & lyrics by WPB)
WPB - guitar & vocals
Melanie Doane - fiddle & harmony vocal

11.  Brave Wings   (Music & lyrics by WPB & Stephen Fearing)
WPB - harmonica & vocal
Stephen Fearing - guitar & harmony vocal

12.  Caney Fork River   (Music & lyrics by WPB)
WPB - guitar & vocal
Ken Whiteley - mandolin & 12 string slide guitar
Jeff Bird - jaw harp

13.  Dismantled Angel   (Music & lyrics by WPB)
WPB - guitar & vocal
Scott Merritt - acoustic organ, tambourine & untuned autoharp
Tannis Slimmon - harmony Vocal

14.  Heartstrings   (Music & lyrics by Tony Quarrington)
WPB - vocal
206 Strings, aka:
Tony Quarrington - guitar, tenor banjo & 2nd dobro
Graham Townsend - fiddle
Ken Whiteley - mandolin & mandocello
Paul Bailie - percussion
Vladimir Gorodkine - cymbalon
Michelle Joseph - tambourine
Bruce Cockburn - guitar
Rodeo String Quartet, aka
Sandy Baron - first violin
Liz Johnston - second violin
Nancy Kersaw - viola
Zoltan Rozsnyai - cello
Rick Fielding - autoharp
Ed Hutchison - first dobro
Daisy Debolt - harmony vocals
Tannis Slimmon - harmony vocal
Jeff Bird - bowed psaltery
Produced by Tony Quarrington
Mainly recorded & entirely mixed by Ed Hutchison at The Recording Service, Toronto, Ontario
Additional recording by:
(11,13) Scott Merritt at The Cottage, Guelph, Ontario
(15) Tanis Slimmon at The Emporium, Guelph, Ontario
(6) Dwain Sands at The Loft, Black Diamond, Alberta
(1) The folks at Current Sounds, New York City, New York
(8) Joan Bessen & Mike Poole at Kleenex Box Head Studios, Nashville, Tennessee

References

1998 albums
Willie P. Bennett albums
Juno Award for Roots & Traditional Album of the Year – Solo albums